The Military ranks of The Gambia are the military insignia used by the Gambia Armed Forces.

The Gambian rank insignia is strongly influenced by its heritage as a part of the Commonwealth of Nations.

Commissioned officer ranks

The rank insignia of commissioned officers.

Other ranks

The rank insignia of non-commissioned officers and enlisted personnel.

References

External links

 

The Gambia
Military of the Gambia
The Gambia and the Commonwealth of Nations